Kuwait Financial Centre (KuwFiC), established in 1974, is an asset management and investment banking institution in the Persian Gulf region with total Assets Under Management (AUM) as of June 30, 2016, of KD 910 million (USD 3.01 billion). Asset management services offered by the company include investment advisory services, GCC & International Investments and Private Equities. Investment banking services include Corporate Finance, MENA Real Estate, US Real Estate, Oil and Gas and Structured Finance. Markaz was listed on the Kuwait Stock Exchange (KSE) in 1997.

Shareholders structuring
The major shareholders (owning more than 5% of the issued shares) of the company directly or indirectly as of October 13, 2016, are as follows:

Subsidiaries and branches
Marmore MENA Intelligence: It was established in the year 2010. Marmore is a majority owned subsidiary of Kuwait Financial Centre "Markaz". Marmore offers full-fledged research in asset management and investment banking focused on Middle East and North Africa (MENA) region. Marmore’s objective is to provide services of financial research and analysis of Mena economies, markets, and companies.
Mar-Gulf Management, Inc. (MGMI): Acts as Markaz's real estate arm in the United States. Since 1988, Markaz has been conducting real estate transactions in the US through Mar-Gulf, located in Los Angeles, California.

Latest awards
2016: Best Equity Manager in Kuwait Award from MENA Fund Managers

2014: Global Investor’s Best Asset Manager Award

2014: EMEA finance’s Best Asset Manager Award

2014: Euromoney's Best Investment Bank Award

2014: Global Finance’s Best Investment Bank Award

References

External links
1.MARKAZ official site
2.www.e-marmore.com

Investment management companies of Kuwait